Legacy High School, formerly known as Robert E. Lee High School, is a public, co-educational secondary school in Midland, Texas. Legacy High School is a part of the Midland Independent School District.  In October 2020, the Midland school board voted to rename the school "Legacy High School".

History
The school originally opened its doors in 1961, seven years before the city’s high schools integrated.  The Midland ISD board voted to rename had six board members voting for, and one voting against the school's name change. A group against the renaming sued five of the board members but the courts rejected the lawsuits.

Athletics

Football
State championships: 1998, 1999, 2000

Demographics
The demographic breakdown of the 2,288 students enrolled for 2018-19 was:
Male - 53.2%
Female - 46.8%
Native American/Alaskan - 0.4%
Asian - 2.8%
Black - 8.3%
Hispanic - 61.2%
White - 26.0%
Multiracial - 1.3%

30.3% of the students were eligible for free or reduced-cost lunch.

Notable alumni

Cedric Benson, National Football League (NFL) running back 
Laura Bush, First Lady of the United States
Dustin Butler, journalist
Tommy Franks, General in the United States Army 
Susan Graham, opera singer
K. C. Jones (American football), Center NFL Football
Tommy Lee Jones, actor and director
Austin Ligon, business executive 
Junior Miller, NFL Tight End 
Tyrone Thurman, college football player
Rex Tucker (American football), Offensive Line NFL Football
Ryan Tucker, Offensive Line NFL Football
Randy Velarde, Major League Baseball (MLB) infielder
Michael L. Williams, politician 
Allen Wilson, high school football coach
Eric Winston, NFL offensive tackle
Jake Young, college football center
Rex Richards, NFL offensive lineman

References

External links

 

High schools in Midland, Texas
Public high schools in Texas
Midland Independent School District
1961 establishments in Texas